The 2019–20 Women's EHF Cup was the 39th edition of EHF's second-tier women's handball competition.  It started on 7 September 2019.
Siófok KC were defending champions.
On 24 April 2020 EHF announced that the competition would be cancelled due to COVID-19 pandemic.

Overview

Team allocation

Round and draw dates
The schedule of the competition was as follows (all draws were held at the EHF headquarters in Vienna, Austria).
On 25 March, the EHF announced that no matches will be played before June due to the coronavirus pandemic.

Qualification stage

Round 1
There are 32 teams were participating in round 1.
The draw seeding pots were composed as follows:

The first legs was played on 7–8 and the second legs was played on 14–15 September 2019. Some teams agreed to play both matches in the same venue.

|}
Notes

1 Both legs were hosted by HC Gomel.
2 Both legs were hosted by Quintus.
3 Both legs were hosted by Super Amara Bera Bera.
4 Both legs were hosted by ŽRK Kumanovo.
5 Both legs were hosted by H 65 Höör.
6 Both legs were hosted by TSV Bayer 04-Werkselfen.
7 Both legs were hosted by HC Astrakhanochka.
8 Both legs were hosted by HC Galychanka.
9 Both legs were hosted by SCM Craiova.
10 Both legs were hosted by IUVENTA Michalovce.
11 Both legs were hosted by Byåsen Handball Elite.
12 Both legs were hosted by Valur.
13 Both legs were hosted by A.C. PAOK.
14 Both legs were hosted by Metraco Zagłębie Lubin.

Round 2
There were 34 teams participating in round 2. 16 teams who qualified from round 1 and 18 teams joining the draw.
The first legs were played on 12–13 October and the second legs were played on 19–20 October 2019.

{{TwoLegResult|'CSM Corona Brașov|ROU|67–63|Super Amara Bera Bera|ESP|35–30|32–33}}

|}
Notes

1 Both legs were hosted by Nantes Atlantique HB.
2 Both legs were hosted by Odense Håndbold.
3 Both legs were hosted by HC Gomel.
4 Both legs were hosted by SCM Craiova.

Round 3
A total of 24 teams entered the draw for the third qualification round, which was held on Tuesday, 22 October 2019. The draw seeding pots were composed as follows:

The first legs were played on 9–10 November and the second legs were played on 16–17 November 2019.

|}
Notes

 Group stage 

The draw for the group phase will be held on Thursday, 21 November 2019. In each group, teams played against each other in a double round-robin format, with home and away matches.

Group A

Group B

Group C

Group D

Quarterfinals
The seedings were announced on 10 February 2020:

The draw event was held at the EHF Office in Vienna on Tuesday 11 February 2020. The draw determined the quarter-final and also the semi-final pairings. Teams from the same group of the group phase could not meet in the next stage.

The first quarter-final leg was scheduled for 29 February–1 March 2020, while the second leg followed one week later.

|}

 Matches Siófok KC won 78–49 on aggregate.Herning-Ikast Håndbold won 57–52 on aggregate.Odense Håndbold won 62–61 on aggregate.HC Podravka Vegeta won 61–51 on aggregate.''

Final four
The semi-finals first legs were scheduled on 4–5 April 2020, while the second leg was scheduled for 11–12 April 2020, but the European Handball Federation announced on 13 March 2020, that the Semi-final matches will not be held as scheduled due to the ongoing developments in the spread of COVID-19 across Europe.
On 25 March, the EHF announced that no matches will be played before June due to the coronavirus pandemic and Women's EHF Cup is foreseen to be played in an EHF FINAL4 format in one venue over two playing days. On 24 April 2020 the matches were cancelled.

Bracket

Semifinals

Third place game

Final

Top goalscorers

See also
2019–20 Women's EHF Champions League
2019–20 Women's EHF Challenge Cup

References

External links
 Official website

 
Women's EHF Cup seasons
EHF Cup Women
EHF Cup Women
EHF Cup (women)